Pontarlier station is a railway station in the commune of Pontarlier, in the French department of Doubs, in the Bourgogne-Franche-Comté region. It is located at the border between France and Switzerland and is located at the junction of Frasne–Les Verrières line of SNCF and the Neuchâtel–Pontarlier line of Swiss Federal Railways.

Services
The following services stop at Pontarlier:

References

External links 
 
 

Railway stations in Doubs